Roshd International Film Festival is eldest film festival in Iran. It is centered on the films with educational and pedagogical themes and is staged every year by the Supplying Educational Media Center, a sub-branch of the Ministry of Education of the I.R.Iran. The festival seeks the main objectives of identifying and selecting the best educational and pedagogical films in order to introduce them to the educational systems.

History
Roshd International Film Festival was first staged in 1963 by the Bureau of Audio-visual Activities of the Ministry of Education of Iran. The official name of this festival was first "the International Educational Film Festival"; and the Persian word "jashnvâre", meaning "something like a feast", was coined and used first in Persian to call this kind of event and eventually this word became the standard Persian translation of the word "festival". 

From the 20th festival on, the official name of the festival turned into its current name, i.e. "Roshd International Educational Film Festival". For the first time in 1993, Roshd International Film Festival was staged simultaneously in Tehran and the city of Bandarabbas, the center of Hormozgan Province, southern Iran. From 1993 up until 2001, the festival was staged every year, simultaneously in Tehran and other provinces of Iran. Since 2001, Tehran is the only host of Roshd International Film Festival and the Provincial Roshd Film Festivals have been staged periodically but not simultaneously in other provinces.

Objectives
The main objectives of Roshd International Film festival are as follows: Identifying, choosing, and introducing the best educational and pedagogical films in order to encourage the Iranian and foreign film makers who are active in the field of educational films and promote artistic and cultural interactions among them. By triggering intercommunication among the educational film makers, Roshd Film Festival seeks to improve the quality and quantity of the educational films produced in the I.R.Iran.

References

External links
Supplying Educational Media Center, a sub-branch of the Ministry of Education of the I.R.Iran, at

Documentary film festivals in Iran
Film festivals in Tehran